The 2013 Asian Beach Volleyball Championship was a beach volleyball event, that was held from November 7 to 10, 2013 in Wuhan, China.

Medal summary

Participating nations

Men

 (1)
 (3)
 (2)
 (1)
 (2)
 (2)
 (1)
 (2)

Women

 (1)
 (3)
 (2)
 (2)
 (2)
 (2)
 (2)

Men's tournament

Preliminary round

Pool A 

|}

Pool B 

|}

Pool C 

|}

Pool D 

|}

Knockout round

Women's tournament

Preliminary round

Pool A 

|}

Pool B 

|}

Pool C 

|}

Pool D 

|}

Knockout round

References 

Men's Results
Women's Results

External links
Asian Volleyball Confederation

Asian Championships
Beach volleyball
Beach volleyball
Asian Beach Volleyball Championship